Jordan is one of one hundred countries that have submitted films for the Academy Award for Best International Feature Film. Their first submission was sent in Fall 2008. The award is handed out annually by the United States Academy of Motion Picture Arts and Sciences to a feature-length motion picture produced outside the United States that contains primarily non-English dialogue.

 Jordan have submitted five films for Oscar consideration, with one of them being nominated.

Submissions
The Academy of Motion Picture Arts and Sciences has invited the film industries of various countries to submit their best film for the Academy Award for Best Foreign Language Film since 1956. The Foreign Language Film Award Committee oversees the process and reviews all the submitted films. Following this, they vote via secret ballot to determine the five nominees for the award. Below is a list of the films that have been submitted by Jordan for review by the Academy for the award by year and the respective Academy Awards ceremony.

Captain Abu Raed, the first feature film to be made in Jordan in fifty years, tells the story of an airport janitor who is mistaken as a pilot by a group of orphan children. It was directed by Los Angeles-based director, Amin Matalqa who studied filmmaking in the United States. Although the film was lauded by many Oscar pundits as a favorite, it ultimately failed to make the 9-film shortlist.

See also
List of Academy Award winners and nominees for Best Foreign Language Film
List of Academy Award-winning foreign language films
Cinema of Jordan

Notes

References

External links
The Official Academy Awards Database
The Motion Picture Credits Database
IMDb Academy Awards Page

Jordan
Academy Award
Academy